Stanley Palk (28 October 1921 – 12 October 2009) was an English footballer. An inside-forward, he moved from South Liverpool to Liverpool in 1940. He remained at the club throughout World War II, whilst also serving with the Royal Navy in Mombasa. He played 13 league games for the club after the war, and was a squad member for the First Division title winning season of 1946–47, before joining Port Vale as part-exchange for a £10,000 transfer fee in July 1948. He made 169 appearances in all competitions for the "Valiants", before heading into non-league football with Worcester City, Flint Town, Oswestry Town, and Maghull.

Career
Palk started his career with South Liverpool, when in 1940 he was invited to train with Liverpool by manager George Kay. He scored 14 goals in 61 games throughout World War II, including one in the Merseyside derby match of April 1944, in the Liverpool Senior Cup. He spent 1944 to 1946 in Mombasa, serving in the Royal Navy. On his return to Anfield he made thirteen competitive appearances, featuring in the First Division title winning season of 1946–47, and the disappointing 1947–48 campaign. He signed for a then club record transfer fee of £10,000 in July 1948.

Palk scored four goals in 42 Third Division South games in the 1948–49 campaign, scoring his first senior goal against Reading in a 2–1 win at Elm Park on 1 September. He then scored three goals in 46 appearances in 1949–50, in the last ever season of football at The Old Recreation Ground. During a 2–1 defeat at Bristol Rovers on 17 December 1949, he caused a minor dispute as his successfully converted penalty kick passed through the net.

He hit six goals in 49 appearances in the 1950–51 season, missing just one league game. This was the first season of football at the newly opened Vale Park. Following the death of manager Gordon Hodgson, Ivor Powell was appointed as manager, before he was replaced by Freddie Steele in December 1951. Palk played 31 games in 1951–52, scoring one goal, before he was released by the club. He had made 169 appearances (159 in the Football League and 10 in the FA Cup) for the "Valiants", scoring 14 league goals. He later played for Worcester City, Flint Town and Oswestry Town.

Personal life
Palk had a son, Gary, and two daughters in Alex and Nicola. He also had four grandchildren (Rob, Rachel, Caroline and Natalie) and one great-grandchild (Oliver) before his death at Royal Liverpool University Hospital on 12 October 2009.

Palk or Polk?
Palk has often been recorded as Polk.

Career statistics
Source:

Honours
Liverpool
Football League First Division: 1946–47

References

1921 births
2009 deaths
Footballers from Liverpool
English people of Cornish descent
English footballers
Association football inside forwards
South Liverpool F.C. players
Liverpool F.C. players
Royal Navy personnel of World War II
Port Vale F.C. players
Worcester City F.C. players
Flint Town United F.C. players
Oswestry Town F.C. players
Maghull F.C. players
English Football League players
English football managers